The Banijurids or Abu Dawudids were a short-lived Iranian dynasty that ruled Tukharistan and parts of the Hindu Kush. They were vassals of the Samanids until their fall in 908.

Rulers
Hasim ibn Banijur (r. 848–857)
Dawud ibn al-Abbas ibn Hashim (r. 857–873)
Muhammad ibn Ahmad ibn Banijur (r. 873-898/899)
Ahmad ibn Muhammad (r. 899–908)

References

Sources 
 
 
 

States and territories established in the 840s
States and territories disestablished in the 900s
Dynasties of Afghanistan
Iranian Muslim dynasties
Vassal and tributary states of the Samanid Empire